Rahim Hatami-ye Yek (also Romanized as Rahīm Ḩātamī-ye Yek, meaning "Rahim Hatami 1"; also known as Ḩātamī-ye Key, Ḩātamī, and Key-e Hātam) is a village in Dowreh Rural District, Chegeni District, Dowreh County, Lorestan Province, Iran. At the 2006 census, its population was 48, in 11 families.

References 

Towns and villages in Dowreh County